Wat Khaek is an unofficial term meaning Indian's temple. It is composed of two words; wat meaning religious place, and khaek meaning "of Indian/south Asian/muslim race/culture". It may refer to:
Sri Mariamman Temple, Bangkok, Hindu temple in Bangkok
Sala Keoku, park in Nong Khai, Thailand